Central High School is a public high school in Central, Louisiana, United States, in the Baton Rouge metropolitan area. It is the only high school in the Central Community School System.

The Central school system serves the entire city of Central, as well as a section of the Brownfields census-designated place and another small unincorporated area.

A 9th grade academy building was planned as a way of relieving congestion within the main school facility and was finished in 2016.

History
The school was originally a part of the East Baton Rouge Parish School Board. As a part of the EBR school board, it served most of Central, and a portion of Brownfields.

Athletics
Central High athletics competes in the LHSAA.

Championships
Football championships
(1) State Championship: 1966

Baseball championships
(7) State Championships: 1978, 1992, 1993, 1994, 1995, 2017, 2018

Notable alumni
Notable people who attended the school include:
 Donnie Lewis – American football cornerback for the Cincinnati Bengals

References

External links
 Central High School
 

Public high schools in Louisiana
Schools in East Baton Rouge Parish, Louisiana